For the Summer Olympics, there have been nine venues that have been or will be used for artistic swimming, formerly known as synchronised swimming . All of the venues used for this sport are also that used for swimming.

References

 
Sync
Venues